PlayStation Magazine may refer to:

Official 
Official U.S. PlayStation Magazine
PlayStation: The Official Magazine (US), which was called PlayStation Magazine until late 2007
PlayStation Official Magazine – UK
PlayStation Official Magazine – Australia
Official PlayStation Magazine (Ireland)

Unofficial 
PlayStation Magazine (Italy)